Yuen Pau Woo (born March 2, 1963) is a Canadian politician and academic who has served as a senator from British Columbia (BC) since 2016. He was previously facilitator of the Independent Senators Group (ISG), taking on the role from September 2017 until January 2022. Woo was also the president and CEO of the Asia Pacific Foundation of Canada, a Vancouver-based think-tank on Canada–Asia relations, until August 11, 2014.

Background
Woo was born in Johor Bahru, Malaysia. His family moved to Singapore shortly after. He grew up there, and was educated at Anglo-Chinese School, Wheaton College, Lester B. Pearson College in Canada, and the University of Cambridge and University of London in the UK. Woo became a permanent resident of Canada in 1988, married a Canadian settling in Newfoundland.

Career 
Woo has previously worked as a consultant on international marine affairs and as an economist for the Monetary Authority of Singapore and the Government of Singapore Investment Corporation. He has also served on the Standing Committee of the Pacific Economic Cooperation Council and as an adviser to the Canadian Ditchley Foundation, the Shanghai WTO Affairs Consultation Centre and the Asian Development Bank.

In December 2008, Woo was appointed by the premier of British Columbia to the province's Economic Advisory Council.

In 2017, Woo was one of the recipients of the Top 25 Canadian Immigrant Awards, presented by Canadian Immigrant Magazine.

Woo was most recently the president and CEO of the Asia Pacific Foundation of Canada. He is a member of the Greater Vancouver Advisory Board for the Salvation Army, on the Global Council of the Asia Society in New York City, a board member of the Public Policy Forum, the Vancouver Academy of Music and the Mosaic Institute.

He is also on the editorial board of Pacific Affairs. At the time of his appointment to the Senate, Woo was a senior fellow in public policy at the Asian Institute of Research at the University of British Columbia.

Areas of research
Woo's research focuses on Asia, and Canada's relations with Asia. He publishes papers on topics ranging from Chinese investments to Asian regionalism. He also writes opinion-editorials.

Political career 
On October 27, 2016, Woo was named to the Senate of Canada by Prime Minister Justin Trudeau to sit as an independent.  He assumed his seat on November 10, 2016. Woo was elected facilitator of the non-partisan Independent Senators Group caucus in the Senate on September 25, 2017.

Senate statements 
In a June 2021 statement, Woo opposed a Senate motion to recognize the ongoing persecution of Uyghurs and other Turkic Muslims in China as a genocide and "call upon the International Olympic Committee to move the 2022 Olympic Games if the Chinese government continues this genocide and call on the government to officially adopt this position".  While calling the recent treatment of Uighurs "repressive — perhaps even genocidal — acts", Woo argued that the motion would not "add any actionable measure specific to the Uighur situation in China" and that it was "simply an exercise in labeling". However, he criticized the situation in Xinjiang by drawing parallels with the Canadian Indian residential school system and mentioned that "repression and forced assimilation only lead to longer-term problems for society at large". 

Woo has opined that there could be no resolution to the situation regarding the detention of Michael Spavor and Michael Kovrig without "some recognition and acknowledgment, on the part of the two governments, of the legitimacy of the justice systems of the other side". His statements were criticized by Conservative Senator Leo Housakos, who argued that China's legal system could not be considered "legitimate" "when it can imprison you without charges, [when it’s] a system that doesn’t disclose what the charges are to you or to your attorney and is a judicial system that is done in closed-door privacy."

In March 2023, Woo raised “fears about how a foreign influence registry could go very wrong”, comparing it to the Chinese Exclusion Act. 
In an e-mail response to the National Post, Woo "encourage[d] Canadians to reflect on whether a foreign influence transparency registry can be developed in such a way as to not punish or stigmatize certain communities, stifle legitimate political debate, and foster parochialism." Gloria Fung, co-ordinator of the Canadian Coalition for a Foreign Influence Registry, believes that Woo's comments are part of what she considers to be a “very well-orchestrated and co-ordinated effort” to stoke fears that the federal government’s intent to investigate foreign agents will contribute to anti-Asian racism.

References

External links 

1963 births
21st-century Canadian politicians
Alumni of the University of Cambridge
Asian studies
Canadian economists
Canadian people of Malaysian descent
Canadian people of Singaporean descent
Canadian politicians of Chinese descent
Canadian senators from British Columbia
Independent Canadian senators
Independent Senators Group
Canadian international relations scholars
Leaders of political parties in Canada
Living people
People educated at a United World College